Clarence-Rockland is a city in Eastern Ontario, Canada, in the United Counties of Prescott and Russell on the Ottawa River. Clarence-Rockland is located immediately to the east of Ottawa and is considered part of the Prescott and Russell County.

The city was formed on January 1, 1998, through the amalgamation of the Town of Rockland with Clarence Township.

Communities
The city includes the communities of Bourget, Cheney, Clarence, Clarence Creek, Hammond, Rockland, and Saint-Pascal-Baylon. The city administrative offices are located in Rockland, which is the largest community in the city.

Demographics

Public transportation
Clarence-Rockland Transpo provides a public transportation service to residents of the city; part of the Rural Partners Transit Service.

See also
List of townships in Ontario
List of francophone communities in Ontario

References

External links

 
Cities in Ontario
Lower-tier municipalities in Ontario